This is a list of notable newspapers in or about Palestine:

 Al Ayyam, the second-largest circulation daily newspaper in Palestine
 Falastin, based in Jaffa and later East Jerusalem from 1911 to 1967
 Felestin, the largest circulation daily newspaper in the Gaza Strip
 Gaza Weekly Newspaper, a weekly newspaper operating out of Gaza
 Al-Hayat al-Jadida, official daily newspaper of the Palestinian National Authority
 Al-Hurriya, political newspaper affiliated with the DFLP (Democratic Front for the Liberation of Palestine)
 Lisan Al Arab, a newspaper in Jerusalem published between 1921 and 1925
 Palestine–Israel Journal, an independent, non-profit, Jerusalem based newspaper published quarterly
 The Palestine Telegraph, first online newspaper based in the Gaza Strip
 Palestine Times, the only English-language daily Palestinian newspaper from 2006 to 2007
 This Week in Palestine, a monthly magazine that covers cultural, social, and, political issues in Palestine
 Al-Quds, a daily newspaper based in Jerusalem
 Al-Quds Al-Arabi, an independent pan-Arab daily newspaper, published in London and owned by Palestinian expatriates
 Mir'at al-Sharq, a newspaper in Jerusalem during the 1920s that favored political commentary

References 

Palestine